Preben Mahrt (28 July 1920 – 19 December 1989) was a Danish film actor. He appeared in 68 films between 1941 and 1976. He was born in Hellebæk, Denmark.

Filmography

Tante Cramers testamente - 1941
Regnen holdt op - 1942
Når bønder elsker - 1942
Ta' briller på - 1942
Lise kommer til byen - 1947
Hatten er sat - 1947
I de lyse nætter - 1948
Hvor er far? - 1948
Det gælder os alle - 1949
Op og ned langs kysten - 1950
Lynfotografen - 1950
Min kone er uskyldig - 1950
Din fortid er glemt - 1950
Hold fingrene fra mor - 1951
Vores fjerde far - 1951
Tre finder en kro - 1955
Den store gavtyv - 1956
Hvad vil De ha'? - 1956
Hidden Fear - 1957
Natlogi betalt - 1957
Lån mig din kone - 1957
Amor i telefonen - 1957
Skarpe skud i Nyhavn - 1957
Mor skal giftes - 1958
Pigen og vandpytten - 1958
Kærlighedens melodi - 1959
Far til fire på Bornholm - 1959
Helle for Helene - 1959
Tre må man være - 1959
Vi er allesammen tossede - 1959
Kvindelist og kærlighed - 1960
Eventyrrejsen - 1960
Forelsket i København - 1960
Den hvide hingst - 1961
Rikki og mændene - 1962
Slottet - 1964
Mord for åbent tæppe - 1964
Don Olsen kommer til byen - 1964
Pigen og millionæren - 1965
Jeg - en kvinde - 1965
Jensen længe leve - 1965
Flådens friske fyre - 1965
Pigen og greven - 1966
Slap af, Frede - 1966
Soyas tagsten - 1966
Nyhavns glade gutter - 1967
Elsk din næste - 1967
Mig og min lillebror og Bølle - 1969
Nøglen til Paradis - 1970
Guld til præriens skrappe drenge - 1971
I morgen, min elskede - 1971
Min søsters børn når de er værst - 1971
Nu går den på Dagmar - 1972
I Tyrens tegn - 1974
Mafiaen, det er osse mig - 1974
Overklassens hemmelige sexglæder - 1974
I Tvillingernes tegn - 1975
Brand-Børge rykker ud - 1976
Spøgelsestoget - 1976

External links

1920 births
1989 deaths
Danish male film actors
People from Helsingør Municipality
20th-century Danish male actors